European route E 441 is part of the international E-road network.

Route 
 
 E40 Chemnitz
 E49 Plauen
 E51 Hof

External links 
 UN Economic Commission for Europe: Overall Map of E-road Network (2007)
 International E-road network

441
441